Mya Aye was a Burmese educator. He was Burmese Minister of Education, serving from March 2011 until his death in December 2013. He was previously a rector at Mandalay University.

References

Government ministers of Myanmar
Education ministers
Education ministers of Myanmar
Year of birth missing
2013 deaths